Allen Eller (December 11, 1976 – November 4, 2016) was an American soccer player who most recently played for the Cleveland Freeze in the PASL.

Biography
Eller attended the University of Akron, playing on the men's soccer team from 1995 to 1998.  In 1999, Eller turned professional with the Pittsburgh Riverhounds of the USL A-League.  In the fall, Eller moved indoors with the Cleveland Crunch of the National Professional Soccer League.  In 2001, Eller did not play the outdoor season, but in February 2002, he signed with the Harrisburg Heat for the second Major Indoor Soccer League.  He finished the season with the Heat. On January 31, 2003, the Heat traded Kyle Swords and Eller to the Baltimore Blast for Gino DiFlorio.  The Blast won the 2003 and 2004 league titles.  On March 29, 2005, the Blast traded Eller and Neil Gilbert to the Cleveland Force for Joel Bailey and Sipho Sibiya.  The Force lost to the Milwaukee Wave in the championship series that season.  During this time, Eller also spent the 2003 outdoor season with the Cincinnati Riverhawks.  In 2006, he briefly played for the Cleveland Internationals of the Premier Development League.  In 2008, Eller joined North Coast Soccer of the Premier Arena Soccer League. November 12, 2009 he signed with the Ohio Vortex.  In November 2011, Eller moved to the Cincinnati Kings for one season. He has played regularly with Croatia Cleveland Soccer Club, from its juniors program to its men's team in the Lake Erie Soccer League, having won several titles throughout the years.

Eller died aged 39.

References

External links
 

1976 births
2016 deaths
Soccer players from Cleveland
American soccer players
Akron Zips men's soccer players
Baltimore Blast (2001–2008 MISL) players
Cincinnati Riverhawks players
Cleveland Crunch (NPSL) players
Cleveland Force (2002–2005 MISL) players
Cleveland Internationals players
Harrisburg Heat players
Major Indoor Soccer League (2001–2008) players
National Professional Soccer League (1984–2001) players
Professional Arena Soccer League players
Pittsburgh Riverhounds SC players
A-League (1995–2004) players
USL League Two players
Association football forwards
Cincinnati Kings players
Cleveland Freeze